Gary Ivan Mercer (born 22 June 1966) is a New Zealand rugby league and rugby union coach and former professional rugby league footballer. A New Zealand international representative player, he has spent most of his career in Britain both playing and coaching. He is a former defence coach of Glasgow Warriors and a former coach at the SRU working in their Scottish Rugby Academy. As of March 2016, he was the head coach of Biggar RFC.

Playing career
In his long career he has represented the New Zealand national rugby league team within rugby league and New Zealand Māori sides and has played for the Leeds Rhinos, Bradford Northern, Warrington Wolves, Castleford Tigers (Heritage № 789) and Halifax.

Challenge Cup Final appearances
Gary Mercer played right- in Warrington's 14-36 defeat by Wigan in the 1990 Challenge Cup Final during the 1989–90 season at Wembley Stadium, London on Saturday 28 April 1990, in front of a crowd of 77,729.

County Cup Final appearances
Gary Mercer played  in Bradford Northern's 12-12 draw with Castleford in the 1987 Yorkshire Cup Final during the 1987–88 season at Headingley, Leeds on Saturday 17 October 1987, and played left- in the 11-2 victory over Castleford in the 1987 Yorkshire Cup Final replay during the 1987–88 season at Elland Road, Leeds on Saturday 31 October 1987.

Regal Trophy Final appearances
Gary Mercer played left- in Warrington's 12-2 victory over Bradford Northern in the 1990–91 Regal Trophy Final during the 1990–91 season at Headingley, Leeds on Saturday 12 January 1991.

Coaching career

Rugby League
Mercer was also the player-coach at the Halifax Blue Sox, and coach at the Castleford Tigers, his first game in charge was on 25 April 2004, and his last game in charge was on 18 September 2004.

Rugby Union

Glasgow Warriors

Mercer switched to rugby union and became the defence coach for the Glasgow Warriors from June 2005 to June 2012 leaving the Warriors at the same time as Sean Lineen. While he was there praise was heaped on his defensive coaching.

Scotland

He became the Scotland Under-20 assistant coach and worked with the Under-21 side. He then worked for the Scottish Rugby Academy.

Yorkshire Carnegie

He left the Scottish academy in August 2014 to have a brief spell running Yorkshire Carnegie.

Glasgow Hawks

Mercer was the head coach of Glasgow Hawks.

Biggar

Mercer moved on to Biggar.

FUDs

Founding member of the FUDs society, with co-members Toby Harris and Nathan Rainbow.

Family 
Mercer currently lives with a son, Zach, a daughter, Clara, and his wife, Karen, in Glasgow, Scotland. He also has twin daughters residing in Australia. Gary has 4 brothers and 1 sister and played alongside his older brother Danny for Central Rugby League in the Bay of Plenty.

Inherited two more from his most recent employment venture.

References

External links
Warrington’s World Cup heroes

1966 births
Living people
Bay of Plenty rugby league team players
Bradford Bulls players
Castleford Tigers coaches
Castleford Tigers players
Glasgow Warriors coaches
Halifax R.L.F.C. coaches
Halifax R.L.F.C. players
Leeds Rhinos coaches
Leeds Rhinos players
New Zealand Māori rugby league players
New Zealand expatriate sportspeople in England
New Zealand Māori rugby league team players
New Zealand national rugby league team players
New Zealand rugby union coaches
New Zealand rugby league coaches
New Zealand rugby league players
Northern Districts rugby league team players
Oldham R.L.F.C. coaches
Rugby league fullbacks
Rugby league players from Tauranga
Rugby league wingers
Warrington Wolves players